Princess Antoinette of Saxe-Coburg-Saalfeld (Antoinette Ernestine Amalie; 28 August 1779 – 14 March 1824) was a German princess of the House of Wettin. By marriage, she was a Duchess of Württemberg. Through her eldest surviving son, she is the ancestress of today's (Catholic) House of Württemberg.

Born in Coburg, she was the second daughter of Francis, Duke of Saxe-Coburg-Saalfeld and Countess Augusta Reuss-Ebersdorf. She was also the elder sister of King Leopold I of Belgium and the aunt of both Queen Victoria and her husband, Prince Albert. Her maternal grandparents were Heinrich XXIV, Count Reuß-Ebersdorf and Karoline Ernestine von Erbach-Schönberg, and her paternal grandparents were Ernst Friedrich and Antoinette of Braunschweig-Wolfenbüttel.

Life 

In Coburg on 17 November 1798, she married Alexander of Württemberg. The couple settled in Russia, where Alexander, as a maternal uncle of both Emperors Alexander I and Nicholas I made a military and diplomatic career.

Antoinette, who was regarded as influential, was bearer of the Grand Cross of the Imperial Russian Order of Saint Catherine.

Antoinette died in St. Petersburg. She was buried in the Ducal crypt of Schloss Friedenstein in Gotha, where her husband and sons Paul and Frederick found their final resting place.

According to Queen Louise of Prussia, Antoinette could have had an illegitimate child. Her brother George wrote on 18 May 1802: "[...] The Württemberg couple didn't speak to each other in 2 years, but she was with child and certainly the father was some Herr von Höbel, a Canon. I know all this from the Duke of Weimar, and is holy true."

Issue

Duchess Marie of Württemberg (17 September 1799 – 24 September 1860). She remained unwed until the age of 33 and then, on 23 December 1832, she married her mother's own brother, Ernest I, Duke of Saxe-Coburg and Gotha, and thus became the step-mother of Prince Albert
Duke Paul of Württemberg (1800–1801) died in infancy at the age of one
Duke Alexander of Württemberg (20 December 1804 – 28 October 1881) he married Princess Marie d'Orléans on 17 October 1837. They had one son.
Duke Ernest of Württemberg (11 August 1807 – 26 October 1868) he married Natalie Eischborn on 21 August 1860. They had one daughter:
Alexandra von Grünhof (10 August 1861 – 13 April 1933) she married Robert von Keudell on 15 September 1883. They had three children:
Walter von Keudell (17 July 1884 – 7 May 1973) he married Johanna von Kyaw on 6 February 1912. They had four children.
Otto von Keudell (9 February 1887 – 12 May 1972) he married Maria Momm (15 July 1895 – 17 April 1945) on 14 August 1920. They have seven children. He remarried Edelgarde von Stülpnagel on 5 September 1947. They have four children.
Hedwig von Keudell (13 April 1891 – 11 October 1987) she married Karl von der Trenck on 17 July 1918. They had five children.
Duke Frederick Wilhelm Ferdinand of Württemberg (29 April 1810 – 25 April 1815). Died at the age of four years old.

Ancestry

Notes

Bibliography 
 von Wiebeking, Carl Friedrich. Biographie des Herzogs Alexander zu Württemberg. Munich, 1835.
 Sauer, Paul. "Alexander (I.)." In Das Haus Württemberg. Ein biographisches Lexikon,  ed. Sönke Lorenz, Dieter Mertens, and Volker Press. Stuttgart: Kohlhammer Verlag, 1997.

External links 

1779 births
1824 deaths
Princesses of Saxe-Coburg-Saalfeld
Duchesses of Württemberg
Daughters of monarchs